ICM may refer to:

Organizations
 Irish Church Missions
 Institut du cerveau et de la moelle épinière, a research center
 Interdisciplinary Centre for Mathematical and Computational Modelling, University of Warsaw
 International Confederation of Midwives
 ICM Partners, a talent and literary agency with offices in Los Angeles, New York, and London
 ICM Research, a polling company (originally Independent Communications and Marketing); a subsidiary of Creston plc, a marketing services company registered in England and Wales
 ICM Registry LLC, the company that sponsors the .xxx Internet top-level domain for adult entertainment
 Independent Citizens' Movement, a local, conservative, United States Virgin Islands party
 Chartered Institute of Credit Management, a UK-based professional Institute, formerly Institute of Credit Management
 Institute of Commercial Management a UK-based body for Commercial and Business Development Managers
 Intergovernmental Committee for Migration (now International Organization for Migration)
 Islamic Center of Murfreesboro

Science and technology
 Idealized cognitive model
 Image Color Management
 Independent Chip Model
 Insertable cardiac monitor
 International Congress of Mathematicians, the largest conference for the topic of mathematics hosted by the International Mathematical Union (IMU)
 Iterated conditional modes, an algorithm for approximate statistical inference, which finds a local maximum in the posterior distribution of a Markov random field
 Inner cell mass
 Intensive care medicine
 Integrated catchment management
 Integrated Coastal Management
 Interim Control Module
 Internal Coordinate Mechanics
 Intracluster medium
 Iodinated contrast medium
 Ion Conductance Microscopy - methods based on Scanning ion-conductance microscopy
 Interconnect Modeling Specification
 Interdisciplinary Contest in Modeling
 Interactive collateral management
 Ischemic Cardiomyopathy

Military
 Iraq Campaign Medal
 Improved Conventional Munition
 Intercontinental ballistic missile

Other
Icecream Man
 Indian classical music
 Intelligence Commendation Medal
 Intentional camera movement is used in creative photography
 Interactive Contract Manufacturing
 Internationales Congress Center München
 NS Intercity Materieel, an electric train operated by Dutch Railways